Wilhelm Dreher (10 January 1892 in Ay an der Iller, Neu-Ulm district – 19 November 1969 in Senden) was a German politician with the Nazi Party.

Dreher was a member of the Reichstag, first being elected in 1928 and retaining his seat until the defeat of Nazi Germany. In the early 1930s, he was close to Gregor Strasser for a time. He was recognised within the Nazi Party as an economics specialist and he wrote on this topic for Völkischer Beobachter.
In 1933, he became the Polizeidirektor in Ulm and an Oberführer in the SS.

References

1892 births
1969 deaths
People from Neu-Ulm (district)
Nazi Party politicians
Members of the Reichstag of the Weimar Republic
Members of the Reichstag of Nazi Germany
SS-Oberführer